Kamuli Sugar Limited (KSL), is a sugar-manufacturing company in Uganda.

Location
The coordinates of the company headquarters are: 0°51'07.0"N, 33°07'34.0"E (Latitude:0.851955; Longitude:33.126103). The company is a member of the Millers Association of Sugarcane, a nationwide industry group of small sugar manufacturers in Uganda.

Overview
Kamuli Sugar Limited, founded in 2010, is a member of the Pramukh Group of Companies, which includes Pramukh Steel Limited, founded in 2007, and Ajay Cotton Limited, founded in 2009.

See also
List of sugar manufacturers in Uganda
Kamuli District

References

External links
Website of Kamuli Sugar Limited
Sweet lure of sugar leaves Kamuli farmers exposed
Uganda not repackaging foreign sugar

Sugar companies of Uganda
2010 establishments in Uganda
Agriculture in Uganda 
Food and drink companies established in 2010